Stephen Stepanek (born July 20, 1951) is an American politician from New Hampshire. A member of the Republican Party, he served as chair of the New Hampshire Republican Party from 2019 to 2023.

Education and background 
Stepanek attended Villanova University, where he received a B.S. degree in 1975. In 2010, Stepanek confirmed he was arrested for drunk driving.

Political career

New Hampshire House of Representatives 
In 2014, Stepanek was elected to the New Hampshire House of Representatives, representing the town of Amherst in the 22nd Hillsborough district. He did not seek re-election in 2016. During the 2016 presidential election, Stepanek was a New Hampshire co-chair for Donald Trump's campaign.

General Services Administration (GSA) 
On March 5, 2018, the U.S. General Services Administration named Stepanek Regional Administrator of GSA's New England region. As the New England Regional Administrator, Stepanek oversaw all of GSA's operations in New Hampshire, Connecticut, Maine, Massachusetts, Rhode Island and Vermont, including management of federal real estate and information technology. 

In this role, he was responsible for an inventory of 419 government-owned or leased buildings and 288 employees. On May 24, 2018, Stepanek resigned from his position with the agency for an undisclosed reason.

State party leadership 
In 2019, Stepanek was elected to lead the New Hampshire Republican State Committee, defeating Keith Hanson, the chair of the Sullivan County Republican Party, by a margin of 300 to 81. In 2021, he was reelected to lead the party with the support of Governor Chris Sununu. Following the 2020 New Hampshire elections, Stepanek chose to step aside as state party chair.

2024 presidential election 
In 2023, Stepanek was chosen by Donald Trump's presidential campaign to help oversee the candidate's operations in the state ahead of the 2024 New Hampshire Republican primary.

References

|-

1951 births
21st-century American politicians
Living people
Republican Party members of the New Hampshire House of Representatives
Chairpersons of the New Hampshire Republican State Committee
New Hampshire politicians convicted of crimes

Donald Trump 2024 presidential campaign